Mike Nacua (born June 14, 1973), better known as Pekto, is a Filipino actor, comedian and television host.

Career
Born and raised in the province of Cebu, Mike "Pekto" Nacua was discovered by GMA Network in 2003 as an actor and comedian. He started his career as an stand-up comedian on their TV shows and films. He is most notable for his role in Etheria as Banak in 2005. In 2012, he was cast in My Daddy Dearest as Marco and the following year, became part of the cast of Ismol Family playing the role of Bobong.

Filmography

Film

Television

Awards
 2013 BVU Cougars football team
 28th PMPC Star Awards for Television
 27th PMPC Star Awards for Television
 24th PMPC Star Awards for Television
 CPDRC Dancing Inmates

References

External links
 
 Sparkle profile

1973 births
Living people
Filipino male television actors
Filipino male comedians
Male actors from Cebu
Participants in Philippine reality television series
GMA Network personalities
Filipino television variety show hosts